The Chronicle Tower (aka Lexicon Tower) is a 36-storey 115m tall residential building in City Road, London, on the west side of the City Road Basin, part of the Regent's Canal. The closest underground station is Angel.

The building includes 146 apartments and is close to the "Square Mile" (London financial city) and "Silicon Roundabout".

The architects were Skidmore Owings & Merrill (SOM) who also designed other notable buildings in the world including Willis Tower in Chicago and Burj Khalifa in Dubai.

The building has an on-site gym, spa and swimming pool.

Gallery

References

Skyscrapers in the London Borough of Islington
Skidmore, Owings & Merrill buildings
Buildings and structures in the London Borough of Islington
Residential buildings completed in 2016